My Little Pony: Friendship Is Magic is an animated television series produced by Hasbro as part of the My Little Pony toy franchise, which is tied in with the 2010 relaunch of dolls and play sets and original programming for the American children's cable channel Discovery Family (formerly Hub Network). Lauren Faust was selected as the creative developer and executive producer for the show based on her previous animation experience with other animated shows such as Cartoon Network's The Powerpuff Girls and Foster's Home for Imaginary Friends. Under Hasbro's guidance, Faust developed the show to appeal to the target demographic of young girls, but created characters and settings that challenged formerly stereotypical norms of "girly" images and added adventure and humorous elements in order to keep parents interested.

The series received widespread praise from both television critics and parental groups. It also found a large audience of adult internet users in late 2010 and early 2011, forming a subculture. These fans, mostly consisting of adult men, were drawn to the show's characters, stories, animation style and influence of the show's propagation as an Internet meme. The fandom adopted the name brony (plural bronies), a portmanteau of "bro" and "pony", as well as pegasisters, which is also a portmanteau of pegasus and sister. Though initially considered to propagate the humorous and ironic concept of people enjoying a show intended for young girls, the fandom has shown deeper appreciation for the show far beyond this concept and is considered part of a New Sincerity trend. Its technology-savvy members have created numerous works in writing, music, art and video based on the show, have established websites and fan conventions for the show and have participated in charitable events around the show and those that create it. The fandom has also drawn criticism from the media and pundits who have derided the older demographic's embrace of a television series marketed towards young girls as well as mass amounts of fan-produced pornographic artwork and literature and alleged misogyny by bronies.

The appreciation of the show by an older audience came as a surprise to Hasbro, Faust and others involved with its development, but they have embraced the older fans while also staying focused on the show's intended audience. Such reciprocity has included participation in fan conventions by the show's voice actors and producers, recognition of the brony fandom in official promotional material, and incorporating background characters popularized by the fans (such as the fandom-named "Derpy Hooves") into in-jokes within the show. As a result of these efforts in part, My Little Pony: Friendship Is Magic has become a major commercial success with the series becoming the highest rated original production in Hub Network's broadcast history.

History

Origins (2010–12)
One of the first critical reviews of Friendship Is Magic, which was published shortly after the initial broadcast in October 2010, was written by Amid Amidi of the animation website Cartoon Brew, who wrote that the show was a sign of "the end of the creator-driven era in TV animation". Amidi's essay expressed concern that assigning a talent like Faust to a toy-centric show was part of a trend towards a focus on profitable genres of animation such as toy tie-ins to deal with a fragmented viewing audience and overall "an admission of defeat for the entire movement, a white flag-waving moment for the TV animation industry." The article said this concern was over the fact that more and more shows seem to be driven by company executives who want to sell their products, rather than creators. Though the show had been discussed on 4chan's 'comics and cartoon' board ('/co/') before the essay's publication, the alarmist nature of the essay led to more interest in the show, resulting in a positive response for the series for its plot, characters, and animation style. This reaction soon spread to the other boards of 4chan, where elements of the show quickly inspired recurring jokes and memes on the site. Some of these included adopting phrases from the show like "anypony", "everypony" and "nopony", instead of "anybody", "everybody" and "nobody", or jokingly stating that they watch the show for the "plot", a reference to the ponies' flanks.

The number of Friendship Is Magic posts drew attention on the site. Fans of the show defended it against various trolling attacks from other 4chan boards, leading to a temporary ban on the discussion of anything related to ponies. Christopher Poole, the founder of 4chan, briefly acknowledged the popularity of the show on the site at the 2011 South by Southwest festival. Poole later created a dedicated board for discussion of the show and its fandom. Though the discussion of the show continued at 4chan, fans created other venues to discuss it, and the fandom spread to other Internet forums.

Popularity (2012–15)
The adult interest in the show is comparable to that of Looney Tunes, Animaniacs, Tiny Toon Adventures, Rocko's Modern Life, Phineas and Ferb, The Powerpuff Girls, SpongeBob SquarePants, and Yo Gabba Gabba!; older audiences appreciate jokes aimed at adult viewers and a sense of nostalgia for older cartoons and animated films. Many of the aforementioned shows had attracted college-aged fans who, when Friendship Is Magic was airing, would be raising children of their own. The show references works that older viewers would recognize, such as I Love Lucy, The Benny Hill Show, Jaws, 2001: A Space Odyssey, Diamond Dogs, The Big Lebowski, Ghostbusters, Star Wars and Fear and Loathing in Las Vegas. Most of these fans are surprised by their fondness for the show. Shaun Scotellaro, operator of Equestria Daily, one of the main fan websites for the show, said, "Honestly, if someone were to have told me I'd be writing a pony blog seven months ago, I would have called them insane." He commented that the spread among adults was accelerated by its presence in online gaming. Mike Fahey, an editor for the gaming website Kotaku, noted that the fandom was "building friendships among a diverse group of people that otherwise might have just sat on either side of the Internet, flinging insults at each other". Dr. Patrick Edwards, who performed several "Brony Studies" to survey and analyze the fandom, observed that the brony fandom, unlike most other fandoms which "aren't welcoming to people who are different", promotes the show's message of love and tolerance.  Further interest came from the furry community, which includes a large number of animation fans. One contributor to "The Brony Study" (below), Dr. Marsha Redden said that the adult fans are "a reaction to the US having been engrossed in terrorism for past ten years" in a manner similar to the Cold War, and are "tired of being afraid, tired of angst and animosity"; the show and its fandom are outlets from those strifes. She compared the brony fandom to that of the bohemian and beatniks after World War II and of the hippies after the Vietnam War. In a similar vein, Amy Keating Rogers, one of the show's writers, believes that the fans have come to like Friendship Is Magic due to "so much cynicism and negativity out there in so many [other] shows" while the show "has such a positive message" that counters this.

Peak and decline (2015–2021)
After increasing in popularity in the early 2010s, the fandom reached its peak in the mid-2010s, exemplified by BronyCon 2015 drawing over 10,000 guests. However, the following years would see Friendship is Magic'''s popularity decline. The National Post reported in early 2019 that several prominent Friendship is Magic-themed conventions such as BronyCAN had been over for years, the fandom was rapidly shrinking due to the show's end becoming increasingly apparent, and that BronyCon was ending after its 2019 iteration due to attendance having halved between 2015 and early 2019.

Unconfirmed (later confirmed) leaks of information from Hasbro stated that the show's ninth season, which premiered in 2019, would be the last for the "G4" (Generation 4) ponies with a move towards a fifth generation ("G5"). Equestria Daily saw significant drop-off in readership in the preceding years with most readers primarily discussing new episodes rather than other fan content. The fandom's largest convention, BronyCon, had seen its peak attendee numbers drop from 10,000 to under 6,000 in 2018 and decided that it would be appropriate to end the convention after a four-day event in 2019.

Renewal with Generation 5 (2021–present)
The 5th generation of My Little Pony was launched in October 2021 with a CGI animated film My Little Pony: A New Generation, set in the same universe as Friendship is Magic but many years later with new characters. It will be followed by the animated series of My Little Pony: Tell Your Tale and My Little Pony: Make Your Mark in 2022 using these same new characters. The fandom has embraced the new Generation 5, with fandom websites such as Equestria Daily displaying official and fandom-created content from both generations 4 and 5.

Fan activities

Older fans of the show use the word brony, a portmanteau of the words "bro" and "pony". Though this generally refers to male fans, the term is often applied to fans of any gender. Another term, "Pegasister", has been used to refer to older female fans of the show. Two informal surveys of 2,300 and 9,000 participants respectively revealed that the average age of adult fans is around 21, that approximately 86% were male, and that 63% were currently pursuing a college degree or higher qualification. A subsequent 2013 survey with over 21,000 respondents showed similar numbers, and highlighted that the majority of fans were in the 15–30 age range, with the average age between 19 and 20, and over 65% were heterosexual. Further, using the Jungian personality test, the survey revealed that the largest fraction of respondents (approximately 27%) fell into the "INTJ" classification, which normally only occurs in 1–3% of the population, according to the surveyors. Many in the fandom who had difficulty in meeting others or being treated fairly by others found the fandom as a way to meet people with similar interests and become more social. Hub Network's CEO and President Margaret Loesch, who was the executive producer of the 1980s and 1990s animated My Little Pony television shows, noted that there were male fans of those past shows, but there are considerably more for Friendship Is Magic due to the quality of the show and the influence of social media and the Internet.

Some bronies are enlisted personnel in various United States Armed Forces, who have included the various "cutie marks" symbols from the show as insignia on their uniforms or equipment, despite not being appropriate practice for most branches, or worn only during training operations. Margaret Loesch, the CEO and President of The Hub, noted from an email from a group of United States enlisted personnel in Afghanistan explained how they came by the show by way of their daughters, but found the emphasis on teamwork and covering each other's backs resonated with their military fellowship. A fan-conducted "herd census" suggests that, there are between 7 and 12.4 million people in the United States that would identify themselves as bronies.

A more detailed study, "The Brony Study", is currently being conducted as of 2012 by Dr. Patrick Edwards, a psychology professor at Wofford College with his neuropsychologist associate Dr. Redden. The two had initially compiled one of the aforementioned informal surveys and Edwards has presented the results at the ongoing brony conventions. Edwards noted that the brony culture provided "the opportunity to study a fan phenomenon from its inception", and planned to continue the survey to watch the evolution of the culture. Professor emeritus Bill Ellis of Penn State University has compared the brony culture to that of otaku, fans of Japanese anime. Ellis, speaking at the 2012 AnimeNEXT convention, considered that both bronies and otaku fans are "psychologically and developmentally normal" and are simply "non-majoritarian" in their choice of active interests. Ellis noted that fans of both groups often are ridiculed for their interest in media targeted for the opposite gender.

Though the initial growth of the fandom may have come from 4chan participants enjoying the ironic nature of grown men enjoying a show for girls, the fandom continues to grow based on sincere appreciation of the work. Robert Thompson, a professor of media studies at Syracuse University, stated that "It's one thing for guys to like motorcycles and muscle cars and soccer. For a guy to like My Little Pony, it's so out there that it becomes almost avant garde. It has a hip quality to it." According to Angela Watchcutter of Wired, the fandom is an example of internet neo-sincerity, where these older viewers watch the show "un-ironically" and "without guilt" breaking gender stereotypes, furthermore creating new material around it. Prof. Roberta Pearson of the University of Nottingham in film and television studies stated that "This is a level of fan devotion I've not seen before," while Prof. Charles Soukup of the University of Northern Colorado in communication studies suggested that this effort is an indication of the "ultra-cult era" that bronies exhibit, where "media consumers discover extremely unexpected and obscure media texts to cultivate uniqueness and distinctiveness for their mediated identities". Jessica Klein, writing for Salon, noted that the fandom was an especially welcoming space for female fans in comparison to other male-dominated fandoms.

Online

Websites such as Equestria Daily and Ponychan were created for fans to share artwork, stories, music, and news about the show. Founded in January 2011, Equestria Daily had over 36 million pageviews in its first 9 months, and has since surpassed 500 million views (June 2014). The blog, which receives more than 175,000 visits a day and is fully funded by advertising revenue, was established by 23-year-old college student Shaun Scotellaro for the purpose of collecting fan fiction and news specific to Friendship Is Magic. Shaun eventually cut back on his community college classes in order to continue running the site out of his parents' house in Glendale, Arizona, when it grew in popularity. He believed the show needed a unified fan base at the time, as there existed an overarching concern that Hasbro would not be authorizing a second season. In September 2017, selected archives of Equestria Daily were included in the Library of Congress's "Web Cultures Web Archive Collection" by the American Folklife Center; the collection was established to "documenting the creation and sharing of emergent cultural traditions on the web".

Conventions

Fans commonly organize local meet-ups and conventions in their local areas. One of the first published conventions was BronyCon, which was first held in New York City with the show's supervising director as a guest. The first BronyCon attracted 100 people, but the third, held in January 2012, was attended by 800, and the fourth expanded to a two-day event in June 2012 at the Meadowlands Exposition Center in New Jersey, with more than 4,000 attending with developer Lauren Faust and voice actors John de Lancie, Tara Strong, Andrea Libman, Peter New, Lee Tockar, Amy Keating Rogers, Cathy Weseluck and Meghan McCarthy as special guests. Strong even attended the convention Canterlot Gardens in a full Twilight Sparkle cosplay to surprise fans. Subsequent BronyCon events moved to a larger space provided by the Baltimore Convention Center, with more than 8,000 attending. Other brony conventions include Everfree Northwest in Seattle, Washington, Midwestria in Chicago, Illinois, Canterlot Gardens in Cleveland, Ohio, Equestria LA in Los Angeles, BABSCon in Burlingame, California, Ponycon NY in the metropolitan New York City region, BronyCAN in British Columbia, Canada, GalaCon in Ludwigsburg, Germany, BUCK in Manchester, United Kingdom, PonyCon AU in Sydney, Australia, Crystal Mountain Pony Con in Salt Lake City, Utah  and Pacific PonyCon in San Diego, California. Nearly a dozen brony conventions were planned in 2012. In addition, established My Little Pony conventions prior to the Friendship Is Magic show, such as the "My Little Pony Fair" or "UK PonyCon", have seen increases in their numbers due to the attendance of bronies. A long-running annual art show, the "My Little Pony Project", where artists re-imagine My Little Pony figurines and toys into works of art, has also seen additional attendance and contributions from the brony community.

Charity and fundraising
The fandom is considered to be charitable, raising money for a number of different efforts. The Brony Thank You Fund was originally established to create a fan-funded advertisement to air on Hub Network as a thank you to the show's creators in November 2012. The charitable drive far exceeded its goal, with additional funds used to give money to provide toys for children through Toys For Tots. The fund has since incorporated in the state of New Hampshire, and successfully registered as a non-profit 501(c)(3) organization under United States law. They claim to be the first such media-related fandom to achieve this status. In December 2013, the Fund donated $50,000 to endow an animation scholarship in perpetuity at the California Institute of the Arts. Similarly, a group called "Bronies for Good" ran blood drives and raised over $60,000 during 2012 for charities like the Children's Cancer Association, Room to Read, CureSearch, and Your Siblings. Voice actress Tara Strong has gained help from the fandom for her "Kiki's Cancer Fund" to help the daughter of a close friend who had been diagnosed with a brain tumor, and has stated that the child "wouldn't be alive today without the My Little Pony fans"; raising $100,000 to help  however, the girl subsequently died of her illness. Faust enlisted help from the bronies to raise money for the Wildlife Learning Center in California, with the Center offering to name some of its animals after characters in the show when certain donation levels were raised.

In January 2014, 11-year-old Michael Morones of North Carolina attempted suicide after being bullied by his schoolmates for watching the show and was subsequently hospitalized. The brony community subsequently reached out to the family and, with several members of the show's cast and crew, started a charity drive to help pay for his medical bills and a non-profit organization to help combat bullying; the efforts raised over $48,000 within a week and more than $72,000 a month later. Many of these donations were raised by Tony Wayne and other tattoo artists across the country, with the funds going to Morones's family and anti-bullying charities. Thousands of men and women received pony tattoos to both support Morones and show their support for anti-bullying. Morones, whose suicide attempt left him in a vegetative state, died on October 27, 2021, at the age of 19.

The documentary film, Bronies: The Extremely Unexpected Adult Fans of My Little Pony, was funded several times over its requested Kickstarter amount, allowing the filmmakers to expand the scope of the project. An organized group of fans, calling themselves the "Humble Brony Bundle", accepted donations from its members towards the Humble Indie Bundle, a charitable independent video game sales drive for Child's Play and the American Red Cross, which topped the contribution list for one sale and contributed the largest single donation for a later sale after a friendly competition with Minecraft developer Markus Persson. In the next major bundle, the same friendly rivalry topped the donation charts; the Humble Brony Bundle donated over US$13,000 and exceeded Persson's and the rest of the leaderboard's donation.

Arts and entertainment

Many artists use sites such as DeviantArt to display fan art based on existing and fan-created characters; more than 500,000 pieces of Friendship Is Magic artwork were present on DeviantArt by June 2012. Adult fans have also created a number of plush toys and other figures based on the show's and fandom-created characters, which they sell on eBay and other auction sites to other fans, sometimes for over 100 US dollars.

Videos that incorporate footage from the show, including music videos, parodies and remakes of movie and video game trailers, are posted regularly on YouTube. One early video that caught media attention was made by high school student Stephen Thomas, using science to dissect some of the physical impossibilities on My Little Pony as part of a class presentation; it was later featured on the Tosh.0 website. Remixed versions of professional works using Friendship Is Magic footage have been noticed by their creators; filmmaker Edgar Wright noted My Little Pony versions of the trailers for his films Scott Pilgrim vs. the World and Hot Fuzz. Top Gears UK blog team and the UK edition of the Top Gear magazine noted a video using clips of their show featuring pony characters. A fan-made Friendship Is Magic version of South Korean rapper Psy's "Gangnam Style" music video incorporating an "invisible horse dance" has been highlighted by media outlets as one of the top takes on the video. One fan, Zachary Rich, created a full-length Flash-based fan film, "Double Rainboom", as part of his college coursework at the Savannah College of Art and Design. Pony-based videos of "Weird Al" Yankovic's songs that Yankovic had highlighted in his Twitter feed led to discussions between the musician and the show directors, and eventually a guest appearance in the show in the fourth season episode "Pinkie Pride".

One of the longest is "Fallout: Equestria", written by "Kkat" based on the Fallout video game series. Another notable fan fiction list includes selected works by Bernard Doove, an author of adult-oriented furry stories; specifically mentionable are the House Path series and the Off The Mark trilogy, which have been published in online, printed and e-book form.

Some fans have created video games based on Friendship Is Magic, such as the fighting game My Little Pony: Fighting Is Magic (which eventually became Them's Fightin' Herds), modifications of existing games like Team Fortress 2 and The Elder Scrolls V: Skyrim, or crossover artwork between the animated show and video game settings. Flash-based applications allow fans to create their own pony characters in the artistic style of the show.

The fandom has been noted for the quantity and diversity of music produced by its members, including cover versions of songs from the show and original songs inspired by the show and its fandom. In January 2014, BronyTunes (an iOS and web app) was released that collected over 7,000 songs and remixes inspired by the show. "Everfree Network", a brony media network, compiled more than 4,800 pieces of fan music by over 500 different musicians in late December 2011. Thiessen commented that many of these fan productions approach the quality of his studio's work, and suggested the possibility of crowd-sourcing some aspects of future production, while the show's composer, Daniel Ingram, often features fan-made songs on his personal webspace. A group of fan musicians compiled a charity album of original songs, entitled Smile, which raised over $21,000 within a month for the Children's Cancer Association.

The fandom is also notable for its prominence in science, technology, and engineering. 15.ai, a popular artificial intelligence text-to-speech web application created by an anonymous research scientist from the Massachusetts Institute of Technology, features the voices of a number of main, secondary, and supporting characters from Friendship Is Magic. The developer has stated that the logo of 15.ai, which features a robotic Twilight Sparkle, is an homage to the fact that her voice (as originally portrayed by Tara Strong) was indispensable to their work. In addition, the Pony Preservation Project is a "collaborative effort by /mlp/ [the My Little Pony board of 4chan] to build and curate pony datasets" with the aim of creating applications in artificial intelligence. The Friendship Is Magic voices on 15.ai were trained on a large dataset crowdsourced by the Pony Preservation Project: audio and dialogue from the show and related media—including all nine seasons of Friendship Is Magic, the 2017 movie, spinoffs, leaks, and various other content voiced by the same voice actors—were parsed, hand-transcribed, and processed to remove background noise by the contributors of the Pony Preservation Project.

Reception
Production staff and cast

Lauren Faust, the then-executive producer, expressed appreciation for show's adult fans on her DeviantArt page. Faust had not expected men without children to watch it, but said, "The fact that they did and that they were open-minded and cool enough and secure in their masculinity enough to embrace it and love it and go online and talk about how much they love it—I'm kind of proud." Of her surprise to the unexpected fandom, Faust said, "From the messages I've received, these episodes have lifted spirits, brought parents and kids together, changed perspectives and inspired the most unlikely of people in the most unlikely of places. Who would have thought it from a show about candy-colored ponies?"

Faust noted the cynicism about the brony fandom, and commented that in considering the idea of grown men watching a show for little girls, "They think there's something wrong with that, something devious about it"; she noted that it was "upsetting to me that people jump to those conclusions". Faust believes that her future animated shows aimed at girls will be easier to sell considering the male adult fandom of Friendship Is Magic, and that the type of programming is not as great a risk as is perceived. After Hasbro issued a cease and desist to the Fighting Is Magic project over the use of copyrighted and trademarked characters, Faust offered to provide the developers with original character arts to allow them to continue to develop the game without copyright issues.

The internet groups surrounding the fandom have enabled the show's producers to quickly assess their work; director and producer Jayson Thiessen stated "As soon as the episode airs, I can go online and see people's responses in real time". Many of the creative staff are on various social media services and directly interact with the fandom, including doing questions-and-answer sessions live during the broadcast of new episodes. Daniel Ingram, who writes and composes some of the songs featured in the show, was pleased with the fan's reaction to the series' music but said, "I never forget about the original demographic of our show, which is six-year-old girls. Just because it's for kids... I don't think that influences me in terms of how sophisticated I want to make the music."

The voice actors also showed appreciation for the adult and male fans. Andrea Libman, who voices Pinkie Pie and Fluttershy, found that more people wanted to meet her as a result of the show and commented that among the fan community, "there's some really talented artists doing really amazing stuff". Tara Strong, who voices Twilight Sparkle, used Twitter to interact with fans and started a "Twilightlicious" meme trend. Ashleigh Ball, who voices Rainbow Dash and Applejack, attributes increased attention her band Hey Ocean! has received to the brony community. Michelle Creber, who voices Apple Bloom and provided the singing voice for Sweetie Belle, has collaborated with fan musicians in order to create new works.

John de Lancie was enthralled by the sudden surge in fandom from the brony community after the broadcast of the two-part second season premiere featuring his voice work as the main antagonist Discord (which Faust had created after a character previously played by de Lancie, Q from Star Trek: The Next Generation), and has embraced the attention. He compared the male fandom of a girl-oriented show to the large number of female fans of the original Star Trek series, and the parallels of what the fans did to support the respective shows. De Lancie helped to make a Kickstarter-funded documentary at the fourth BronyCon convention about the growing fandom, Bronies: The Extremely Unexpected Adult Fans of My Little Pony. Faust, de Lancie and Strong were credited as executive producers on the project. The funding drive ended with over $320,000 in pledges, making it the second most funded film project on Kickstarter at the time. After its release, the project has announced plans to remake the documentary to incorporate additional footage taken at European fandom gatherings. This has been shown at film festivals in 2013 and released for home media distribution.

Similarly, Ball's surprise at the appreciation of the fandom led her to participate in another documentary, A Brony Tale, directed by Brent Hodge, recording her participation at the January 2012 BronyCon event in New York City, as well as discussions with members of the fandom. The film, which was picked up for distribution by Morgan Spurlock, debuted to critical praise at the 2014 Tribeca Film Festival, and reached theatrical and home media markets in July 2014.

At times, portions of the brony fandom have reacted passionately to changes in the direction of the show, such as in the change to "The Last Roundup" episode involving the Derpy Hooves character. Similarly, the Season 3 finale episode "Magical Mystery Cure" ended with main character Twilight Sparkle transforming into a winged unicorn (alicorn) and being named a princess. This change was revealed prior to the episode's airing and a portion of the fandom were critical of the change, referring to it as a "jump the shark" moment for the series while others considered that it was a significant change of one of the show's more popular characters that most of the brony fandom could relate with. The showrunners stated in response that while Twilight's physical appearance would change, this would not otherwise alter her personality or the general concept of the show. On the announcement of the My Little Pony: Equestria Girls feature-length animated film, in which the pony characters are re-envisioned as human teenage girls attending high school, a large fraction of the adult fandom reacted negatively towards the premise. Several fans stated that this was a corporate play by Hasbro and veered away from the direction that Faust had envisioned for the show at its onset, while others commented on the clichéd aspect of a high school comedy, the overly thin appearance of the human characters, and other factors. The fan site Equestria Daily had issued a caution to its readers to not lash out at the show's creators who had also worked on the film, and other more predominant figures of the fandom urged others to continue to support the staff. Equestria Daily's Shaun Scotellaro considered the fandom's behavior to be "your typical overreaction to something changing in your favorite series".

Allusions within the show
Faust and the production team have acknowledged some of the fandom and fan-created elements of the show and incorporated them into the animation. Though Hasbro's priority is to deliver a child-friendly show, the writers and production staff, according to Linda Steiner, senior vice president of Hasbro Studios, "We will certainly, for fun, do the 'bronie' check to see if this could pass with them, but our job is to deliver to the kids first." Margaret Loesch, president and chief executive of Hub Network, said that they have kept their nods to the fandom to subtle hints. She added, "We haven't driven this movement, the fans have, and we don't want to get ahead of that. We want to nourish this phenomenon, not manipulate it." A writer for the show, Meghan McCarthy, said, "Some pop culture-y things are thrown in, but we don't want to do anything that's too 'wink wink'. It detracts from the story that we're trying to tell". Many of the nods to the older audience are drawn in by the storyboard artists and animators, who are challenged to populate scripted scenes with background ponies; McCarthy points to the example of ponies fashioned after the main characters from The Big Lebowski due to having to fill in space for scenes set in a bowling alley for the episode "The Cutie Pox".

In the first episode, a background gray Pegasus pony is shown in one scene with a cross-eyed stare, which was the result of an overlooked animator's joke. The 4chan boards quickly dubbed the character "Derpy Hooves" (based on the Internet slang word "derp") and created a more detailed personality for her, despite having minimal screen time. Faust responded to the fans, and the production team has kept the "Derpy" character with the cross-eyed look starting with "Feeling Pinkie Keen", where the team incorporated her into a slapstick sight gag. The character has since become a mascot of the fandom. According to supervising director Jayson Thiessen, the teams considered the character "like a little Easter egg for people to catch".

At the conclusion of the first season, one of the show's animators confirmed that "Derpy" would be a scripted background character in the second season, and was a part of several sight gags. In the original broadcast of the second season episode "The Last Roundup" as well as on the home media release The Friendship Express, "Derpy" was called out by name by Rainbow Dash and was given lines (as voiced by St. Germain) and klutzy mannerisms as a direct call-out to the brony fandom. Though many fans appreciated the inclusion, some viewers had a negative response to the character, believing her portrayal insulted the mentally handicapped. Hasbro subsequently modified these scenes and while "Derpy" is still present in subsequent broadcast and digital versions of the episode, she is unnamed and a different voice is used. According to Hasbro's Nicole Agnello, "Some viewers felt that aspects of the episode 'The Last Roundup' did not stay true to the core message of friendship which is the heart and soul of the series. Hasbro Studios decided to make slight audio alterations to this single episode." Despite Hasbro's intentions, some members of the brony community were disappointed to which they made efforts to restore the original voice. "Derpy" remained in background cameos throughout other episodes in season 2 and 3. Within season 4, Derpy was re-introduced, remaining silent and unnamed but with her original wall-eyed look, as a side character in the main story of "Rainbow Falls". The appearance was planned as a big reveal for the brony fans, according to co-director Jim Miller, and that "she is here to stay" according to Hasbro's vice president for entertainment Mike Vogel. The Derpy character is used often on Hasbro's marketing of the show. For example, Hasbro's exclusive pony toy at the Comic-Con International and My Little Pony Fair in 2012 was based on "Derpy", and has the same cross-eye look.

Other non-speaking background characters that caught the attention of the fandom also had expanded roles. For example, a silent female unicorn pony character sporting neon colors and sunglasses and manning a DJ mixer that briefly appeared in "Suited for Success", was given the stage name "DJ P0N-3" in an online poll held by Equestria Daily. This name was reused in the "Equestria Girls" advertisement. The character also appeared as a DJ in the season 2 finale "A Canterlot Wedding – Part 2" and became part of the new release of My Little Pony toys in late 2012, as well as the 2013 San Diego Comic-Con exclusive figurine. The character additionally had an expanded yet also non-speaking role in the second Equestria Girls film Rainbow Rocks.

Fans of the show also nicknamed a male pony character with a brown coat, messy brown mane and an hourglass cutie mark "Doctor Whooves" because of a purported likeness to David Tennant's portrayal of the Doctor from the long-running BBC television series Doctor Who. The character had a minor speaking role in the episode "Call of the Cutie" and a brief role as a time-keeper in the episode "The Super Speedy Cider Squeezy 6000". Other licensed media further carry the homage: Enterplay's trading card line associates the character, named "Time Turner", as dealing with "all things timey-wimey" around Ponyville, alluding to a famous quote from the episode "Blink", while one of the store-exclusive covers for the Friendship Is Magic comic set the Doctor Whooves character among many iconic Doctor Who elements. The character was openly named Doctor Hooves in The Elements of Harmony: The Official Guidebook, published by Little, Brown and Company. Professor Colin Burnett of Washington University in St. Louis considered the adoption of these fan names and characteristics within the show as demonstration of co-creative collaboration that can exist in modern media, emphasized by unexpected demographics of bronies that helped to bolster the creators' success with the work.

As a tribute to the older fandom as well as all other fans of the show, the milestone 100th episode "Slice of Life", which was first broadcast in 2015, featured several of the background characters that the fans had made popular, including Derpy (now named "Muffins"), Doctor Whooves and DJ P0N-3 among others.

Hasbro and Hub Network

Hasbro and Hub Network (prior to its rebranding as Discovery Family) have also sought to market to bronies. Steiner said, "You develop the best show you can, and hope the humor will translate to a broader audience. But I've been in the business for 25 years and I've never seen anything like this." A company spokeswoman said that bronies are "a small group of My Little Pony fans who don't necessarily fit what one might expect to be the brand's target audience", while its core audience in the older market is predominantly females. Despite the bronies being an unusual and unexpected audience, Hasbro and Hub Network chose to "salute and embrace all the viewers who have embraced our brand", according to Margaret Loesch, CEO of Hub Network and former executive producer of the original My Little Pony animated series. Hasbro has allowed the fandom to be an organic movement leading to its growth and success, according to Stephen Davis, head of Hasbro Studios.

Before the brony fandom arose, Hasbro had introduced new My Little Pony toys, including convention-exclusives, at the San Diego Comic Con International. With a brony element in attendance, the convention-exclusive toys have reflected the brony culture; a large poster was published in 2011 that included several background characters that had attracted the fandom's interest. A toy of a pegasus pony character named Derpy Hooves was made available for both the convention and My Little Pony Fair in 2012. Toys "R" Us provided early, limited numbers of new toy based on the zebra character Zecora, due for release in late 2012 by Hasbro. Both Zecora and "Derpy" toys sold out within the first day of the convention. In 2014, Shapeways announced an association with Hasbro to create 3D printed versions of Friendship Is Magic characters, with fan artists creating and selling their designs under Hasbro's license and approval. Shapeways had previously published fan-financed and -created models without Hasbro's license before being asked to cease and desist such practice; the new approach with Hasbro's blessing has been seen as helping to break down the walls between content and fans in the age of social media.

Teenage and adult fans have shown interest in clothing with images from the show; Erin Comella, brand manager for My Little Pony, said that these fans are "literally dressed in the brand". Hasbro has been providing its licensed clothing vendors such as Hot Topic with My Little Pony-themed shirts and other apparel for all genders and multiple age groups. According to Julie Duffy, Hasbro's vice president of global brand publicity, while their primary market is the young demographic, "[Hasbro has] found ways to strike the right balance by working with licensees to offer [their] adult fans exciting merchandise geared just for them". Though Hasbro has not revealed how much of My Little Pony product sales are bolstered by the brony fandom, Caitlin Dewey of The Washington Post suggests that the continued success of the franchise four years after its introduction is tied in part to bronies' interest in the show and products, and Hasbro's williness to market products towards the adult audience.

Hasbro and Hub Network have used advertising parodying others' works that are more geared towards the adult fans. Hub Network used a promotional billboard in Los Angeles showing the pony characters parodying the films Bridesmaids and Poltergeist. Hub Network also made a parody of Apple's App Store, which included the phrase, "There's a pony for that." A promotional campaign leading up to the second season finale, "A Canterlot Wedding", in which Twilight's brother Shining Armor marries Princess Cadance, parodied elements of the 2011 British royal wedding, including the placement of an advertisement in the New York Times wedding announcement section.

At the onset of the fandom, Hasbro was generally tolerant of uploads of content and derivative works on sites such as YouTube. However, in late 2011, a fan-run website called "Ponyarchive" that was reposting for no cost the complete high-definition episodes that were being sold on iTunes closed down after receiving cease and desist letters from Hasbro. The otherwise "hands-off" policy has enabled the growth of the fandom. In another case, Hasbro was required to take legal action to protect the My Little Pony trademark against a group working on a massively multiplayer online game, MLP: Online, though the developers, after working with Hasbro's legal team, are seeking to develop a new Friendship Is Magic-related game without the trademark issues. Though many fan-created videos combine copyright footage of Friendship Is Magic with adult elements from films inappropriate for children like Inglourious Basterds or foul language from musical artists such as Wu-Tang Clan, Hasbro has not taken a stance against these videos and has recognized that the parodies and remixes form a culture of participation that has helped to draw larger attention to the show. In light of the Stop Online Piracy Act, Daniel Nye Griffiths of Forbes considered the fans' re-use of copyrighted works and creation of new works from them as examples of the inevitable result of any media gaining a fandom, and praised Hasbro for embracing the means to extend the brand through this instead of trying endlessly to stop such infringements. In November 2012, Hasbro sent a cease-and-desist letter to MLP Online, and in February 2013, sent one to the producers of My Little Pony: Fighting Is Magic. 

A monthly My Little Pony: Friendship Is Magic comic began its run in November 2012 by IDW Publishing. The comic, like the show, is aimed to appeal to younger children with their parents, but includes various pop culture and fandom nods to draw in the older readers. IDW has reported that over 100,000 copies of the first issue were pre-ordered, outselling numerous other comic for that month, and making it the best selling issue in IDW's history, as well as one of the best selling single issue comics of 2012. IDW have made plans to reprint the first issue to meet further demand as well as republish the first set as a standalone volume early in 2013. The monthly comic and its separate "micro-series", featuring single-issue stories that focus on one character, have regularly been along the top 100 issues sold each month, one of the few non-DC, non-Marvel comics outside of The Walking Dead that appear in this list, and remain IDW's top-selling publication.

In addition to releasing official digital albums of songs from the show due to brony demand, Hasbro has worked with Lakeshore Records to create an album of EDM remixes of the show's songs, entitled DJPON3 Presents My Little Pony: Friendship Is Magic Remixed inspired by the numerous fan remixes.

Criticism
Gender norms
The adult fandom has been perceived negatively by others, with coverage of the brony fandom overshadowing the show itself. Much of the fandom's ridicule from others comes from the perception of the mostly adult male fanbase enjoying a show that is marketed to the young female demographic. Through this, the brony community has encountered ridicule through trolling on internet forums, not only from its inception at 4chan, but after moving away from the site. This has also been called out in conservative popular media. The Fox News Channel comedy talk program Red Eye poked fun at the fandom because it largely consists of young adult males. Commenting on Schlichter's article, Greg Pollowitz of National Review Online wrote that considering the target audience he could not understand the show's appeal to adult men. Jerry Springer attempted to bring bronies onto his talk for a segment on "Outrageously Guilty Pleasures", though fans warned others about the potential ridicule.

The gender-based criticism has also affected younger male fans of the show, such as with Michael Morones above. Another story that gained national attention was that of Grayson Bruce, a nine-year-old fan who was told to stop bringing a Rainbow Dash backpack to school to prevent bullying that he was receiving. An online campaign to show support for Grayson gained over 32,000 supporters on its Facebook page, and the brony fanbase, the show's creators and voice actors, and various public figures including Glenn Beck, Ronan Farrow and Eugene Volokh have stood up for the boy's actions. The school later revised its decision after speaking to the family and clarifying it was not trying to blame the child for the incident.

Rebecca Angel, writing for Wireds Geekmom column, described some of the negative feedback from fellow writers about the mostly male brony culture that included accusations of pedophilia and immaturity. Angel defended the fandom's culture, describing adult fans' interest as a form of escapism, and that the show provides characters they can relate to and talk about with other fans. She also acknowledged the double standard whereas females can watch male-oriented entertainment without question, while male bronies receive criticism about their interest in the show. Angel later described the brony fandom as rebellious towards gender roles, stating that "having interests that go against what men are supposed to embrace is the sneakiest kind of rebellion". In a similar vein, an "Idea Channel" segment from the Public Broadcasting Service said that the ridicule received by the brony community is partly because the male appreciation for the show challenges preconceived notions of gender roles in the mass media.

Violence and pornography

Some media have been critical of the adult-oriented material created by fans. In some cases, these videos may appear in Internet searches that children may perform while looking for online copies of the program or while searching for images of characters from the show, forcing parents to have to discuss pornography and sex with their children. For example, the parody series PONY.MOV, animated by animator Max Gilardi in the style of John Kricfalusi, places the characters in explicit adult situations and was described by the web site io9 as "disgusting ... and most certainly NSFW". Fans acknowledge that such material is generated by a subset of the group, but consider it "an unavoidable part of any online fandom", as described by TV Guides Sadie Gennis, and do not worry about this facet.

Male hegemony and female alienation
A study performed by graduate students from the University of Connecticut found that "a particularly extreme subset" of the brony fandom shows characteristics of hegemonic masculinity, where male members strive to keep their majority in the numbers by purposely excluding and alienating females. Sherilyn Connelly and others have noted that bronies alienate other fans of the franchise by focusing on the fandom itself rather than the franchise. She also said that bronies created an atmosphere of entitlement and anger when the franchise didn't accommodate the fans' demands, resulting in a culture where death threats are made publicly and lightly.

Racism and nationalism
Since the fandom's birth on 4chan in 2010, many media outlets have been critical of a vocal portion of the fandom that advocates racist and white nationalist ideologies. The New York Post reported that My Little Pony was a popular show among white nationalist and neo-fascist groups. Vice reported on alt-right attempts to infiltrate brony and furry fandoms, where edgy and politically incorrect memes proliferated. In Rolling Stone, journalist Lauren Orsini acknowledged that extremist subsets of the fandom had existed since at least the mid-2010s.

Kaitlyn Tiffany, writing for The Atlantic described the popularity of fanart with racist or violent imagery and accounts who post extremist views on imageboards, particularly 4chan's "Politically Incorrect" and "My Little Pony" boards. Mic reported that there was an increasing amount of anti-racist content during the George Floyd protests. In response, Derpibooru, the most popular brony fanart site, officially banned racist content in 2020.

In 2014, a fan-created pony character called "Aryanne" entered circulation, featuring white fur, a blonde mane, blue eyes and a swastika cutie-mark; over 2,000 fan created images of the character were found on the fan site Derpibooru. In 2016, during Donald Trump's campaign for President, images of My Little Pony characters wearing Make America Great Again hats, and Pit Viper sunglasses were commonly found on brony fan sites. The New Republic published an op-ed that decried the fandom's white nationalist aspects, saying "Yes, there is a connection between white identity politics and My Little Pony", saying that many on the alt-right supported the show because they viewed the fictional land Equestria as being an "example of nationalist politics."

Radical aspects of the fandom were scrutinized by the media after the Indianapolis FedEx shooting on April 15, 2021. The shooter, Brandon Scott Hole, frequently posted My Little Pony content to his Facebook page. Fans of the show quickly condemned Hole's actions and the racist views espoused by a small subset of the fandom.

Other media
Before Hasbro revived the toy series with its Friendship Is Magic line, the My Little Pony toys were collected mainly by women who grew up with the toys during the 1980s and 1990s. Bonnie Zacherle, the original creator of the franchise, noted that the toys and show were originally conceived to appeal to preschool children of both genders, and considers it a "good thing" for the adult fandom to have the same appreciation of the show as the collectors. According to Summer Hayes, author of six books about My Little Pony toy collections and organizer of the annual My Little Pony collectors' fair, some of these collectors appreciated the attention of the brony community. Hayes said that the brony community has participated in the toy fair, and that other collectors resent the sudden popularity of Friendship Is Magic. She said that these earlier fans and collectors had thought; " ... what about us? We've been here forever, and nobody seemed to care. But now that there are all these guys in their 20s that are crazy about it, it's suddenly important and it means something." Hayes also said, "To the bronies, I say, I think My Little Pony is awesome, so more power to you".

The adult fandom has gained media attention through outlets such as Wired, Fox News Channel and The Wall Street Journal. Stephen Colbert gave a shout-out to the brony fandom at least twice on his comedy news show, The Colbert Report, although since then his positive connection with the fan base has become questionable. Erin Burnett of CNN's Outfront reported on the 2012 Summer BronyCon, and ended the segment with a recolored character from the show representing the pony version of herself. The fans gave her some artwork of her character as a way of "welcoming [her] to the herd". NPR's comedy radio show Wait Wait... Don't Tell Me! highlighted the brony fandom in an episode in June 2011, and the following week quizzed former US President Bill Clinton about elements from the show during a telephone interview segment called "Not My Job"; Clinton correctly answered the three multiple choice questions, leading at least one journalist to jokingly refer to him as a brony. An episode of Hot In Cleveland dealing with fan conventions included references to the brony fandom.

Lexicographer Grant Barrett listed "brony" as a memorable new word of 2011. Time named "the bronies" as the ninth-best meme of 2011, the Internet meme research site Know Your Meme listed it among its top ten memes of 2011, and PC Magazine named it one of 2011's top memes.

In popular culture
The adult fandom of My Little Pony: Friendship Is Magic has led to references to the program in popular culture. The animated television show Mad spoofed Friendship Is Magic at least twice; one segment was called "My Little War Horse". An episode of Bob's Burgers, "The Equestranauts", satirized bronies and their conventions. A secret level in the video game Diablo III included enemies named "Rainbow Western", "Midnight Sparkle" and "Nightmarity", alluding to Friendship Is Magic. Owlchemy Labs added a "Brony Mode" to their video game Snuggle Truck as free downloadable content in October 2012 specifically as a nod to the brony community. The mode replaces the fuzzy animals in the game with Friendship Is Magic-inspired ponies which the user must drive safely across a landscape. An extended character, the Mechromancer, available as downloadable content for the game Borderlands 2, includes numerous references to the show and the fans through the character's skill tree. Bronies: The Musical is a 2014 off-Broadway production written by Tom Moore and Heidi Powers that is inspired by the brony culture, and won for Best Musical in the Hollywood Fringe Festival. The popularity of the show as a result of the brony fandom led to a brief bit of animation created by the show to be used in an NFL advertisement during Super Bowl XLIX. An episode in Season 3 of The Toys That Made Us covers the "My Little Pony" brand and includes discussions of the brony fandom.

The Pirate Party Germany's parliamentary group in the Abgeordnetenhaus of Berlin (the Berlin state parliament) has insisted on the inclusion of a break called "pony time", in which an episode from the series is shown, during their meetings at their parliamentary office, which displeased many other members in the Berlin parliament. The internet activist group Anonymous used the character Rainbow Dash to deface the website of the Social Democratic Party of Austria in 2011 and 2012. A teenage white hat hacker used the name "Pinkie Pie" for anonymity and a fan drawing of the character wielding an axe as part of a successful entry in an early 2012 contest sponsored by Google Chrome to break the security of the web browser; the same user also was the first to break the security in a second contest held later in 2012, and found an important security flaw in the Linux kernel. A May 2013 update to Google Hangouts included an easter egg that would have Friendship Is Magic-inspired ponies run across the chat window. A similar update in August 2013 as part of YouTube's "Geek Week" added two easter eggs, one that would cause ponies to cross the screen on searching for "bronies", and a second that, if searching on a number of different pony names like "Twilight Sparkle", would change the site's title bar to a representative color of that pony.

An article that appeared in the New York Times on December 26, 2011, "Navigating Love and Autism" by Amy Harmon, described how a young woman with Asperger syndrome used My Little Pony characters to relieve stress. She visualized the character Twilight Sparkle whenever she "found herself in a bad-mood rut". The story misidentified Twilight Sparkle as Fluttershy on initial publication and the paper issued a correction, which some journalists have jokingly considered as "the best New York Times correction ever", though others saw it as a sign of the journalistic integrity of the Times. Harmon was contacted by fans about the mistake, and said, "I hate to get anything wrong, but I confess to some enjoyment in finding the right way to phrase this one." In 2015, the New York Times reported that Dylann Roof, the sole perpetrator of the Charleston church shooting, was a fan of My Little Pony, but later corrected itself after recognizing it had been duped in an experiment run by a blogger who had faked the claim but made it as credible as possible as to test how little fact checking major news sources were doing on a high-interest topic.

Notable fans

The musician Andrew W.K. said that he strongly identifies with the overenthusiastic character of Pinkie Pie. He said, "She's another creature, much like I am in this world, who is doing everything she can to have fun," and that he feels inspired by the character spreading excitement and joy to others. He hosted a panel called "What Would Pinkie Pie Do?" at the Canterlot Gardens convention in September 2012, and described it as "the most intense experience of [his] life".

Lena Hall, a Broadway actress and singer, stated she watches the show as it makes her feel "super happy" and appreciates the lessons the show teaches, and considers herself a "Pegasister". In winning the 2014 Tony Award for Best Actress in a Musical, Hall ended her acceptance speech mentioning the television show's subtitle, "Friendship Is Magic". Over four months after her shout-out at the Tonys, Hall announced on her Twitter that she would be a guest star in the show's fifth season, and soon appeared in the episode "The Mane Attraction" as Coloratura/Rara. Upon the episode's premiere, Hall live streamed her reaction to the episode with her niece on Periscope and letting viewers ask questions during the commercial breaks, she went into detail about her experiences behind the scenes of the production of the episode and her history with the show itself, admitting to binge-watching the first three seasons of the show when she first started to watch it.

After a call-out to bronies on Twitter by fellow professional wrestler Dolph Ziggler, Xavier Woods publicly identified as a brony in March 2015.2K Tournament of Champions: Xavier Woods 6 March 2015 (wearing a BRONY shirt) "Xavier Woods here, reigning and defending 2K champion. This year at WrestleMania, people are gonna come and try to take my title, take my championship. That cannot be done, you ban't neat me! Brony: don't care, what up? Step up, and get bought!" Woods and his fellow members of The New Day, a wrestling stable who were WWE Raw Tag Team Champions at the time (and would go on to become the longest reigning team in WWE history), subsequently added unicorn imagery as a part of their gimmick, even claiming to possess "unicorn magic" to help them in their matches. They also named one of their signature moves the Unicorn Stampede.

Actor Billy Bob Thornton admitted to watching the show during a 2016 interview with GQ. He and his daughter Bella used to watch My Little Pony, which she eventually grew out of, and when searching for the series to watch again, came across Friendship Is Magic and started watching it with her. He also liked the show's positive messages about how the world works, pointing to "The Cutie Map" as an example. On an episode of Late Night with Seth Meyers'', Thornton also claimed that while his daughter's favorite character is Twilight Sparkle, his favorites were Fluttershy (who he said was his favorite because "she talks like Marilyn Monroe") and Rainbow Dash.

William Shatner confirmed himself to be a brony through his personal Twitter, and had been a guest star in the show's seventh season's episode "The Perfect Pear", along with Felicia Day, who appeared in the very same episode.

The CEO of Valve, Gabe Newell, has stated on multiple occasions that he is a fan of the show and is indeed a brony.

See also
Fantasy fandom
Furry fandom

References

Fandom, My Little Pony Friendship Is Magic
2010s in American television
2010s in Canadian television
Internet memes
Subcultures
Television fandom
Animation fandom